Pepper Ann is an American animated television series produced by Walt Disney Television Animation.

Series overview

Episodes

Season 1 (1997–98)
Note: All episodes in this season were directed by Sherie Pollack.

Season 2 (1998–99)
Note: From episode 14 until the end of the series, all episodes were directed by Brad Goodchild.

Season 3 (1999–2000)

Season 4 (2000)

Season 5 (2000)

Pepper Ann
Lists of Disney Channel television series episodes